Valeriy Yakushin (born 12 October 1954) is a Soviet luger who competed during the late 1970s. He won the silver medal at the men's doubles event at the 1978 FIL World Luge Championships in Imst, Austria. He also competed in the men's doubles event at the 1980 Winter Olympics.

References

1954 births
Living people
Russian male lugers
Olympic lugers of the Soviet Union
Lugers at the 1980 Winter Olympics
Place of birth missing (living people)